Yponomeutinae is a subfamily of "micromoths" in the lepidopteran family Yponomeutidae (ermine moths). As their scientific name implies, this is the subfamily containing the type genus of the ermine moths, Yponomeuta. The subfamily has worldwide distribution.

A few species usually separated as subfamily Scythropiinae are sometimes placed here too.

Selected genera
This list mostly based on M. Savela's pages which includes various sources (ed.), 1996. The Moths and Butterflies of Great Britain and Ireland, Vol 3: Yponomeutidae - Elachistidae. and Fauna Europaea. All names except those with additional references are listed on both.

 Anoista
 Banghaasia
 Cedestis
 Charicrita
 Chionogenes
 Eftichia J.F.G.Clarke, 1986
 Euhyponomeuta
 Euhyponomeutoides
 Kessleria
 Lissochroa
 Litaneutis
 Niphonympha
 Nymphonia
 Ocnerostoma
 Opsiclines
 Orsocoma
 Palleura
 Paradoxus
 Parahyponomeuta
 Paraswammerdamia
 Pseudoswammerdamia
 Pseudotalara
 Syncrotaulella
 Spaniophylla
 Steganosticha
 Stryphnaula
 Swammerdamia
 Sympetalistis
 Teinoptila
 Terthroptera
 Xyrosaris
 Yponomeuta
 Zelleria
 Zygographa

References

Yponomeutidae